Illinichernes distinctus is a species of pseudoscorpion in the family Chernetidae.

References

Further reading

 

Chernetidae
Articles created by Qbugbot
Animals described in 1949